Aegeofusinus is a genus of sea snails, marine gastropod mollusks in the subfamily Fusininae of the family Fasciolariidae, the spindle snails, the tulip snails and their allies.

Species
Species within the genus Aegeofusinus include:
 Aegeofusinus angeli (Russo & Angelidis, 2016)
 Aegeofusinus eviae (Buzzurro & Russo, 2007)
 Aegeofusinus margaritae (Buzzurro & Russo, 2007)
 Aegeofusinus patriciae (Russo & Olivieri, 2013)
 Aegeofusinus profetai (Nofroni, 1982)
 Aegeofusinus rolani (Buzzurro & Ovalis, 2005)

References

 Russo P. (2017). New genus Aegeofusinus (Gastropoda: Fasciolariidae) to include small endemic species of the Aegean sea. Bollettino Malacologico. 53: 63–68.

 
Gastropod genera